Ben Parry (born 1965) is a British musician, composer, conductor, singer, arranger and producer in both classical and light music fields. He is the Director of London Voices and Artistic Director of the National Youth Choirs of Great Britain.

Early life
Parry was born and raised in Ipswich, Suffolk, where his father was an organist and music teacher. He studied at Ipswich School and St Catharine's College of the University of Cambridge, where he was a choral scholar. He sang in the King's College Choir and performed in musicals and cabarets.

Career
Early in his career, he was a singer, music director and arranger with The Swingle Singers. With the group, he toured the world and worked with musicians including Pierre Boulez, Luciano Berio and Stephane Grapelli. He wrote over 50 arrangements and compositions for the group and co-produced their recordings for EMI and Virgin Classics.

In 1994, Parry was in the original London production of Cy Coleman's City of Angels at the Prince of Wales Theatre in the West End. In 1995, he and his family moved to Scotland. There, he co-founded the distinguished vocal ensemble, Dunedin Consort, and directed performances at festivals in the UK, Spain, Belgium, France and Canada. He was chorusmaster of the Scottish Chamber Orchestra Chorus and director of choral music at the Royal Scottish Academy of Music and Drama (now the Royal Conservatoire of Scotland) in Glasgow. He directed five productions for Haddo House Opera.

From 2003 to 2008, Parry was director of music at St Paul's School, London. He subsequently moved to Suffolk and took up the post of director at Junior Academy in London, combined with his freelance career. He is Director of the professional choir, London Voices, who have been at the forefront of choral singing in the UK since their foundation by conductor Terry Edwards in 1973. The choir has performed on the soundtracks of major films, including "The Hobbit", The Lord of the Rings, Star Wars, the Harry Potter series, Spectre, Aladdin and Jurassic World. The choir has performed and recorded with major artists, including Sir Paul McCartney, Dave Brubeck, Bryn Terfel, Angela Gheorghiu and Renée Fleming.

He was Assistant Director of Music at King's College, Cambridge from 2013 to 2021, in which role he directed King's Voices.

Parry composed a significant amount of choral music, published by Faber, OUP and Edition Peters. He collaborates regularly with author and lyricist Garth Bardsley, and together they have had works premiered by the BBC Singers, Sheffield Cathedral, Aldeburgh Voices, BBC Singers, St Andrew's University, Chelmsford Cathedral, National Youth Choirs of Great Britain and London Voices.

As a conductor, Parry has worked with the Academy of Ancient Music, Britten Sinfonia, English Chamber Orchestra, London Symphony Orchestra, London Philharmonic Orchestra, London Mozart Players, Scottish Chamber Orchestra, BBC Concert Orchestra, Royal Seville Symphony Orchestra, Scottish Ensemble, National Youth Orchestra of Wales, Cumbria Youth Orchestra and the Vancouver Youth Symphony. He has sung with the Taverner Consort, Gabrieli Consort, Schütz Choir of London and Tenebrae (choir).

In October 2012 Parry was appointed director of the National Youth Choirs of Great Britain. He was made an Honorary Associate of the Royal Academy of Music in 2013 for his services to the music industry.

Parry has made well over 100 recordings for EMI, Decca, Collegium, Virgin, Linn and Signum. He is married to violinist Kathryn Parry and they have three children: Freya Parry, Imogen (Midge) Parry, and George.

Selected discography

 Choir of Royal Holloway 'The Hours' - Choral Music by Ben Parry' (Signum Classics 2020) - composer
 Choir of Selwyn College, Cambridge 'Christmas Music by Ben Parry' (Regent Records 2019) - composer
 King's College Choir: William Byrd Great Service (EMI 1987) – singer
 Cy Coleman: City of Angels: original London cast recording (1st Night 1994) – soloist
 Taverner Consort: Purcell Dido and Aeneas (BBC/Sony 1995) – soloist
 Gabrieli Consort: Music for San Rocco (DG Archiv 1996) – singer
 Dunedin Consort: Copland/Barber In the Beginning (Linn 2000) – conductor
 Scottish Chamber Orchestra/Mackerras: Mozart Requiem (Linn 2003) – chorusmaster
 Paul McCartney: Ecce Cor Meum (EMI 2006) – chorusmaster
 Tenebrae: Prayers for Mankind (Signum 2010) – producer
Coldplay: When I Need a Friend (Everyday Life) – conductor

References

External links
 

1965 births
Living people
People educated at Ipswich School
Alumni of St Catharine's College, Cambridge
Musicians from Suffolk
English operatic baritones
English conductors (music)
British male conductors (music)
British performers of early music
21st-century British conductors (music)
21st-century British male musicians
The Swingle Singers members
Musicians from Ipswich